"Mother-in-Law" is a 1961 song recorded by Ernie K-Doe. It was a number-one hit in the U.S. on both the Billboard Hot 100 chart and the Billboard R&B chart. The song was written and produced by Allen Toussaint, who also played the piano solo. It was issued by Minit Records.

After several unsuccessful takes, Toussaint balled up the composition and threw it away as he was leaving the room. One of the backup singers, Willie Harper, thought that it was such a good song that he convinced K-Doe to give it one more try.

A cover version by The Newbeats was also included on their 1965 album Big Beat Sounds By The Newbeats.

See also
List of Billboard Hot 100 number ones of 1961
List of number-one R&B singles of 1961 (U.S.)
Mother-in-law joke

References
 

1961 songs
1961 singles
Songs written by Allen Toussaint
The Newbeats songs
Billboard Hot 100 number-one singles
Cashbox number-one singles
Minit Records singles